Litice Castle is a castle in Záchlumí municipality in the Ústí nad Orlicí District in the Pardubice Region of the Czech Republic.

History

The steep slopes of the foothills of the Orlické Mountains gave the advantage of a strategic position to the gothic castles being founded there at the close of the 13th century. The high headland around which flowed the Divoká Orlice River was the site chosen just before the year 1300 by the Drslavic family to build up a castle which they named after their original family settlement in the Plzeň area. For a short span of time in the 14th century the Litice castle was owned by two Luxembourg rulers successively, John of Bohemia and Charles IV. In 1371 Boček of Kunštát, a Moravian noble, came with his family to settle at the castle. One branch of the family became naturalized in Bohemia through marriage and the purchase of the Poděbrady and Pardubice estates.

The appearance of the oldest gothic castle was lost under the extensive construction work launched in 1450 by George of Poděbrady, later King of Bohemia. The former gothic likeness can be distinguished only in the two-palace core of the castle, resembling similar architecture applied in the 14th century at Helfenberk and Menstein. The turbulent times following the Hussite Wars, rife with internal conflicts between alliances of the aristocrats fighting for power in the Kingdom of Bohemia, one of the strongest being the Utraquist party of George of Poděbrady, called for essential measures to safeguard this important castle. The reign of George of Poděbrady from 1458 brought peace and quiet to Bohemia for a short time. This was interrupted in the mid sixties of the 15th century by a war caused by the Papal Court instigating the resistance of the local catholic nobility and then asking Matthias Corvinus, the King of Hungary, to intervene.

This was the historical background to swift reconstruction of the castle and its fortifications. The atmosphere of the times and the prevalent bourgeois-aristocratic environment influenced the character of the architecture in the general concept of which the dying tradition of the 14th century can still be traced. This tradition was in conception and architecture practically outdated by 1450. The external system of fortifications, mostly still preserved, surprisingly shows the partial use of artillery when defending the castle. This was due, on the one hand, to the favourable layout of the terrain which reduced the need for elaborate fortifications and cannon bastions to a minimum and, on the other hand, it can be attributed to the generally rather obsolete concept.

The access road to Litice Castle was interrupted at its most vulnerable point by a wall and a deep moat crossed by a drawbridge. The entrance to the castle was through a tower gate built in one piece with the adjacent guardhouse. The front of the gate holds a significant place in Czech creative art. It is one of the few remaining specimens of the stonemason's art of the 1460s and, what is more, it is linked with the King George of Poděbrady himself. The work as such and the setting of the reliefs show the low artistic standard of the sculptor who belonged to the town's stone - masons' workshops. The relief over the small gate for pedestrians carries a helmet set with a jewel and four coats-of-arms-those of Bohemia, Moravia, Upper Lusatia and Poděbrady – and an inscription: "This tower was built during the reign of His Royal Highness King George of Bohemia and Margrave of Moravia in 1468." The text dates the completion of the gate and most likely of the whole Poděbrady era of reconstruction. The figural reliefs on the left side of the gate represent George of Poděbrady with a ribbon across his chest, a human mask in the bottom part and in a niche above the king a figure of a builder carrying a hammer.

The gate itself was protected by a rectangular bastion, the broken line of corner fortifications and, together with another circular bastion beneath the inner castle, they served chiefly for the use of the artillery as it is testified by the still existing embrasures, typical of the Poděbrady-type structures. Preserved to the present time is the southern wing of the castle with its slim, square tower. The halls of the palace, which can be approached from the courtyard over the drawbridge which takes you to the first floor, were illuminated by tall windows with window seats. The residential rooms on the second floor had windows facing the outside of the castle as well. The most notable architecture at Litice is the tower. Its higher artistic value is evident from the remarkable portals giving access from the palace and the vaulting at the different floor levels.

The estate, heavily in debt, was purchased from the sons of George of Poděbrady by Vilém II of Pernštejn who linked it to nearby Potštejn to where he transferred the administrative centre. The importance of the castle started to decline and, because subsequent owners did not pay due attention to its upkeep either, it slowly fell into ruin. From 1562 Litice was owned by the lords of Bubna of Litice. The 19th century witnessed the rapid disintegration of some of the castle structures. Repair work in the years 1890 to 1894 and then in the twenties and thirties of the 20th century stabilized the southern palace and the tower which then received its present gallery and roofing. The condition of the whole building further deteriorated in subsequent decades until the new owner, the State, instituted measures to stabilize the structure and to restore the palace and its foundations.

Gallery

External links

Virtual show

Ústí nad Orlicí District
Castles in the Pardubice Region
Ruined castles in the Czech Republic